Songs to Ruin Every Occasion is the fifth studio album by Michael Carr's comedy character Buddy Goode. It was released on August 14, 2015 both digitally and on CD.

Each song on the album is themed for a different life event or public holiday, such as the NRL Grand Final, Australia Day, the Melbourne Cup, Mother's Day, New Year's Eve and Easter.

On 7 October 2015, it was announced that the album had been nominated for the Best Comedy Release category at the 2015 ARIA Awards. However, it lost to Matt Okine's Live at the Enmore Theatre.

Track listing

References

External links
Official Website
CD Edition
iTunes Edition

Buddy Goode albums
2015 albums